The Nissan Nails is a concept pickup truck built by Nissan. It was introduced in 2001 at the Tokyo Auto Show.

Specifications 
It features a 2-door, 2-seater pickup body style with body panels that Nissan claims are manufactured to be dent and scratch resistant. The load bed of the Nails is placed beneath the wheels, unlike many contemporary pickup trucks, allowing for a low, flat load floor, which makes it easier to load in heavy objects. It also features an upwards opening tailgate. On the interior, the Nails features "integrated communications" tools, such as cellular phone integration.

References 
Nails
Cars introduced in 2001
Pickup trucks
Front-wheel-drive vehicles